{{DISPLAYTITLE:C18H18O3}}
The molecular formula C18H18O3 may refer to:

 Erteberel (SERBA-1), a synthetic, nonsteroidal estrogen which acts as a selective ERβ agonist
 Obovatol, a biphenolic anti-inflammatory, anxiolytic, and nootropic
 SERBA-2, a synthetic, nonsteroidal estrogen which acts as a selective ERβ agonist